DC Brau Brewing is an American brewery based in Washington, D.C., founded in 2009. It is the first brewery to operate inside the District of Columbia since 1956, when the Heurich Brewery closed. The brewery was founded by Brandon Skall, its business manager, and Jeff Hancock, its brewmaster. Hancock has brewed at Grizzly Peak Brewing and Arbor Brewing Company, both in Ann Arbor, Michigan, and at Flying Dog Brewery in Frederick, Maryland.

DC Brau's inaugural beer was The Public, an American pale ale style beer. The brewery has also released an India Pale Ale style called The Corruption, a Belgian-style pale ale called The Citizen, and a pilsner called Brau Pils, as well as other limited releases.

All of the brewery's waste is delivered to a family-owned farm in Haymarket, Virginia, where it is converted into animal feed and composting material.

DC Brau also supported a bill before the Washington City Council that would allow on-site beer tasting at breweries within the city's limits. D.C. law previously only allowed on-site tastings at grocery stores and retailers that do not manufacture beer at the same location, prohibiting the brewery itself from opening a tasting room. DC Brau now offers tastings, pints, and growler fills, as well as free brewery tours.

See also
 List of breweries in Washington, D.C.

References

External links
 
 Jeff Hancock interviewed on NPR's The Kojo Nnamdi Show

Beer brewing companies based in Washington, D.C.
2009 establishments in Washington, D.C.
Companies based in Washington, D.C.
Drinking establishments in Washington, D.C.
Food and drink companies established in 2009
American companies established in 2009